Kurt Thiim (born 3 August 1956 in Vojens) is a Danish race car driver. After his karting career he raced in single-seaters from 1978 to 1984 before moving to the DTM.
He won the championship in his debut year in 1986 driving a Rover Vitesse, and raced an Alfa Romeo 75 in 1987. Despite not winning a second title, he remained one of the series' top drivers for the next decade as a Mercedes-Benz driver. He joined the AMG team in 1988, then Zakspeed in 1992, and returned to AMG in 1996, resulting runner-up in 1992, third in 1990, fourth in 1989 and 1995, fifth in 1994, and sixth in 1993. He collected 19 wins during his DTM career.

After the series was discontinued after 1996, he raced in several other touring car categories, including the German Supertouring Championship and the Danish Touring Car Championship, where he won a title in 2002.

He is the father of racing driver Nicki Thiim.

Racing record

Complete Deutsche Tourenwagen Meisterschaft results
(key) (Races in bold indicate pole position) (Races in italics indicate fastest lap)

Complete International Touring Car Championship results
(key) (Races in bold indicate pole position) (Races in italics indicate fastest lap)

† — Retired, but was classified as he completed 90% of the winner's race distance.

Complete Super Tourenwagen Cup results
(key) (Races in bold indicate pole position) (Races in italics indicate fastest lap)

Complete 24 Hours of Le Mans results

Britcar 24 Hour results

External links
DTC profile

References

1958 births
Danish racing drivers
Deutsche Tourenwagen Masters drivers
Deutsche Tourenwagen Masters champions
Living people
People from Haderslev Municipality
European Le Mans Series drivers
Porsche Supercup drivers
World Sportscar Championship drivers
24 Hours of Le Mans drivers
24 Hours of Spa drivers
Britcar 24-hour drivers
Sportspeople from the Region of Southern Denmark
Mercedes-AMG Motorsport drivers
Nürburgring 24 Hours drivers
Sauber Motorsport drivers
Porsche Carrera Cup Germany drivers